The Cornell International Affairs Review (CIAR) is a peer-reviewed, student-run academic journal published biannually at Cornell University. It primarily publishes student-written research papers on issues such as international relations, international trade and finance, human rights, diplomacy, geopolitics, and development. According to the official website of the Review, it is "dedicated to publishing papers that contribute to our collective understanding of contemporary international affairs," and particularly those that "address events and trends that are not well-established in current scholarship, yet have immediate global relevance and engage a broader and more diverse audience beyond the traditional academic sphere."

References

External links

Online archives

Publications established in 2007
Biannual journals
International relations journals
English-language journals
Cornell University academic journals
Academic journals edited by students
2007 establishments in New York (state)